Cela is a locality and minor local entity located in the municipality of Villafranca del Bierzo, in León province, Castile and León, Spain. As of 2020, it has a population of 22.

Geography 
Cela is located 153km west of León, Spain.

References

Populated places in the Province of León